The 2019 Bahrain–Merida Pro Cycling season was the third season of the  team, which was founded in 2016.

Team roster

Riders who joined the team for the 2019 season

Riders who left the team during or after the 2018 season

Season victories

National, Continental and World champions 2019

References

External links
 

2019 road cycling season by team
Team Bahrain Victorious
2019 in Bahraini sport